Carposina zymota is a moth in the family Carposinidae. It was described by Edward Meyrick in 1910. It is found on New Guinea and northern Australia.

References

Carposinidae
Moths described in 1910
Moths of Australia
Moths of New Guinea